Rubén Falcón Mínguez (born 8 October 1977) is a Spanish former footballer who played as a goalkeeper.

Club career
Born in Zaragoza, Falcón played several years with hometown club Real Zaragoza, but was registered mostly for their reserves. In the 2004–05 season he appeared twice in La Liga with the first team, and also served a loan with UD Almería in the second division whilst under contract to the Aragonese; his top flight debut came on 6 February 2005, in a 1–2 away loss against Albacete Balompié where he came on as a substitute for David Villa late into the second half after Luis García was sent off.

Released in 2005, Falcón resumed his career in the second and third levels (with also brief spells in the fourth), successively representing Villanueva CF, SD Eibar, SD Huesca, Rayo Vallecano, CD La Muela, CF Atlético Ciudad, CD Leganés and CD Teruel.
A fecha de 2021, Falcón se encuentra en el CD Delicias como Entrenador de la Escuela Deportiva LECOP

References

External links

1977 births
Living people
Footballers from Zaragoza
Spanish footballers
Association football goalkeepers
La Liga players
Segunda División players
Segunda División B players
Tercera División players
Real Zaragoza B players
Real Zaragoza players
UD Almería players
SD Eibar footballers
SD Huesca footballers
Rayo Vallecano players
CD La Muela players
CD Leganés players
CD Teruel footballers